The Eurosphere or the European Empire is a concept associated with the public intellectual Mark Leonard, Oxford University academic Jan Zielonka, the European Union Director-General for Politico-Military Affairs Robert Cooper and the former European Commission President José Manuel Barroso.

Background 
Over the past 50 years, the European Union has expanded from 6 founding members to 27; additionally there are 7 candidate and potential candidate countries waiting to join: Albania, Montenegro, North Macedonia, Serbia, Turkey, Bosnia and Herzegovina, and Ukraine, which are candidates, and Kosovo, which is a potential candidate. A number of European countries are integrated economically, as part of the European Single Market and using its single currency, the euro. Through its High Representative of the Union for Foreign Affairs and Security Policy, the EU has the capability to speak with one voice on the world stage and has established association and free trade agreements with many states. Furthermore, through the European Neighbourhood Policy and Union for the Mediterranean it is creating closer ties with countries on its borders; while developing ties with other former European colonies, the ACP countries.

Countries seeking membership in the EU must undergo a great deal of reform, for example the reforms seen in Turkey, such as the abolition of capital punishment. The emergence of the Union's global influence, and the draw of membership, has been the subject of a number of academic writings. Mark Leonard describes the area of EU influence as the "Eurosphere".

Countries within the Eurosphere 

According to Mark Leonard, the Eurosphere includes 109 countries. In Europe, this includes the 27 member states of the EU, applicant countries wishing to join the EU, the Western Balkans and European Commonwealth of Independent States countries (including Armenia, Belarus, Georgia, Moldova, Ukraine and transcontinental Kazakhstan). Curiously, he does not mention Western European countries such as Norway who are already integrated into the EU's single market. Outside of Europe, he lists every African country and every Middle Eastern country, as well as the countries forming the eastern border of the Eurosphere such as Iran, Azerbaijan and Russia.

Other countries that could be said to be within the Eurosphere include European countries belonging to the European Economic Area, such as Iceland or Liechtenstein, states using the euro as their currency, such as Andorra, Monaco and San Marino, or the EU's Outermost Regions (OMR) in the Caribbean, South America and in the Atlantic, such as French Guiana, Guadeloupe, La Réunion, Martinique and Saint Martin. In addition, the Overseas Countries and Territories (OCT) closely associated with the EU in the Atlantic, Caribbean, Pacific and Southern oceans are generally included in the Eurosphere such as Aruba, Bonaire, Curaçao, French Polynesia, Greenland and Saint-Pierre-et-Miquelon.

See also 

 Council of Europe
 Deep and Comprehensive Free Trade Area
 ECHO (European Commission)
 ACP-EU Development Cooperation
 ACP-EU Joint Parliamentary Assembly
 EU-ACP Economic Partnership Agreements
 Enlargement of the European Union
 European Union Association Agreement
 European Economic Area
 Potential enlargement of the European Union
 Eurasian Economic Union
 European integration
 European Neighbourhood Policy
 Eastern Partnership
 Euronest Parliamentary Assembly
 Barcelona Process
 Euro-Mediterranean Parliamentary Assembly
 Mediterranean Union
 European Union as a potential superpower
 EuroVoc
 Foreign relations of the European Union
 EU economic relationships
 Greater Europe
 Multi-speed Europe
 Pro-Europeanism
 Sphere of influence
 United States of Europe
 Southeast Europe Transport Community

Notes and references

Further reading

External links 
 "The EU as a Regional Normative Hegemon: The Case of European Neighbourhood Policy"
 Mahony, Honor (2007-07-11) Barroso says EU is an 'empire' EU Observer.

Foreign relations of the European Union
Political neologisms
2000s neologisms
Spheres of influence
Western culture